Dumbie House, also known as Craigside House, was an 18th-century building (now demolished) in Edinburgh, Scotland, which was home to Braidwood Academy, the first (private) school for deaf children in Britain. It was founded by Thomas Braidwood, a Scottish educator and pioneer in developing the hand gestures of sign language, the forerunner of British Sign Language (BSL) in 1760. It is in the area known as Dumbiedykes which is named after Braidwood school's 'deaf and dumb' pupils.

Early pupils included Francis Mackenzie, Charles Shirreff, John Goodricke, Francis McKenzie, and John Philip Wood.

Sir Walter Scott mentioned Braidwood Academy in his novel Heart of Midlothian (1818).

Samuel Johnson described his own visit to the school in 1773: "one subject of philosophical curiosity to be found in Edinburgh, which no other city has to show; a college of the deaf and dumb, who are taught to speak, to read, to write, and to practise arithmetic, by a gentleman whose name is Braidwood. The number which attends him is, I think, about twelve, which he brings together into a little school, and instructs according to their several degrees of proficiency."

Braidwood relocated to London in 1783, and the building was demolished in 1939. A commemorative plaque was placed on the site in 2015.

Other schools for deaf children in Edinburgh include Donaldson's School for the Deaf.

References 

Schools in Edinburgh
Deaf education
Schools in Scotland
Schools for the deaf in the United Kingdom